Patrik Fredholm (born 10 May 1978) is a retired Swedish football midfielder.

References

1978 births
Living people
Swedish footballers
AIK Fotboll players
Udinese Calcio players
De Graafschap players
A.S.D. Castel di Sangro Calcio players
Örgryte IS players
Kvik Halden FK players
FK Haugesund players
Association football midfielders
Swedish expatriate footballers
Expatriate footballers in Italy
Swedish expatriate sportspeople in Italy
Expatriate footballers in the Netherlands
Swedish expatriate sportspeople in the Netherlands
Expatriate footballers in Norway
Swedish expatriate sportspeople in Norway
Allsvenskan players
Norwegian First Division players
Footballers from Stockholm